Half Control is the fifth album by Six Finger Satellite, released on May 26, 2009 through Load Records. It comprises material the band recorded in 2001 before disbanding shortly after.

Track listing

Personnel 
Six Finger Satellite
Shawn Greenlee – bass guitar
Joel Kyack – guitar
Richard Ivan Pelletier – drums
Jeremiah Ryan – vocals, synthesizer
Additional musicians and production
Jeff Lipton – mastering
Seth Manchester – mixing
Dare Matheson – cover art
Six Finger Satellite – mixing, recording
Keith Souza – mixing

References

External links 
 

Six Finger Satellite albums
Load Records albums